Church of Holy Salvation may stand for:

 Church of Holy Salvation, Cetina
 Church of Holy Salvation, Prizren
 Church of Holy Salvation, Skopje, an Orthodox church in Skopje, Republic of Macedonia